Modernization theory is the predominant explanation for emergence of nationalism among scholars of nationalism. Prominent modernization scholars, such as Ernest Gellner, Benedict Anderson and Eric Hobsbawn, say nationalism arose with modernization during the late 18th century. Processes that lead to the emergence of nationalism include industrialization and democratic revolutions.

Modernization theory stands in contrast to primordialism and perennialism, which hold that nations are biological, innate phenomena or that they have ancient roots. Critics such as Anthony D. Smith and Philip Gorski argue that nationalisms did exist prior to modernity. Critics have argued that modernization theory's applicability to nationalism in European colonies is limited, as more modernized colonies did not undergo nationalist mobilization earlier.

See also 

 Primordialism
 Gellner's theory of nationalism
 Ethnosymbolism
 Modernization theory
 Nationalism studies
 Social constructivism

References 

Sociocultural evolution theory
Modernity
Nationalism studies